Raison may refer to:


People
 André Raison (c 1640 – 1719), French baroque composer and organist
 Kate Raison, Australian actress
 Max Raison (1901-1988), English cricketer
 Miranda Raison, English actress
 Timothy Raison, British politician

Other uses
Raison, Himachal Pradesh, India
Raison (cigarette), a South Korean cigarette brand

See also
 Raisin (disambiguation)
 Raison d'état or national interest
 Raison d'être (disambiguation)